Andesanthus gleasonianus, synonym Tibouchina gleasoniana, is a species of plant in the family Melastomataceae. It is native to Colombia and Ecuador.

References

Melastomataceae
Flora of Colombia
Flora of Ecuador
Vulnerable plants
Taxonomy articles created by Polbot